The  is the name of Japanese aerial lift system, as well as its operator. The route, consisting of two lines, climbs Mount Zaō at Zaō Onsen, Yamagata, Yamagata. The lines transport skiers of Yamagata Zao Onsen Ski Resort and rime spectators in winter, tourists and mountain climbers in summer.

Refurbished in 2003, Sanchō Line is the third funitel line to be introduced in Japan, or the first for Japanese ski resorts. The two lines are fairy crowded in winter, but skiers tend to use other chairlifts to reach Juhyō-Kōgen. From Juhyō-Kōgen, only Sanchō Line can reach the summit.

See also
List of aerial lifts in Japan

External links
 Official website
 (Juhyō-Kōgen Station)

Aerial tramways in Japan
Gondola lifts in Japan
Tourist attractions in Yamagata Prefecture
Transport in Yamagata Prefecture